The Culver PQ-10 was an American target drone, designed by the Culver Aircraft Company for use by the United States Army Air Forces. Designed in 1941, the project was cancelled before any aircraft flew.

Design and development
The prototype XPQ-10 was ordered by the United States Army Air Forces in 1941. Derived from the civilian Culver Model MR, the XPQ-10 was a high-wing monoplane equipped with twin Franklin O-300 engines and a fixed tricycle landing gear. Plans were made for the production of PQ-10 series aircraft; however, before the XPQ-10 was completed, the project was cancelled.

Specifications (XPQ-10)

See also

References

Citations

Bibliography

 Juptner, Joseph P. U.S. Civil Aircraft Series, Volume 8. New York: McGraw-Hill Professional, 1993. .

PQ-10
Target drones of the United States
1940s United States military utility aircraft
Cancelled military aircraft projects of the United States
High-wing aircraft
Twin piston-engined tractor aircraft